Kenneth Jones (1 October 1936 – July 2018) was an English professional footballer who played as a full-back for Sunderland.

References

1936 births
2018 deaths
People from Redcar and Cleveland
English footballers
Association football fullbacks
Sunderland A.F.C. players
Hartlepool United F.C. players
King's Lynn F.C. players
English Football League players